Mission Estate Winery is New Zealand's oldest surviving winemaking concern, first established in the Hawke's Bay in 1851 by French Catholic  Marist missionaries for producing sacramental wine. It is one of the largest wineries in the Hawke's Bay and remains wholly New Zealand owned.

History 

Marist missionaries, in order to make sacramental wine, were the first to introduce viticulture to the Hawke's Bay Region, planting the first vineyards in 1851 at the original mission station in Pakowhai. More vineyards were planted at Meeanee, and the mission recorded its first commercial sale of wines in 1870. In 1880 the mission built its seminary building at Meeanee, the two-storey  (French, "the grand house"), and purchased a large  plot of land nearby in Taradale in 1897, where more vineyards were planted. The vines were tended by travelling from Meeanee, however disastrous flooding in 1909 prompted the mission to move its operations to the Taradale location. In 1911 the wooden La Grande Maison building was sawn into 11 separate pieces and transported  to its current location over two days, using traction engines. The 1931 Hawke's Bay earthquake caused extensive damage to the region and the mission estate, including the loss of nine lives when the stone chapel was destroyed. 

The early 21st century saw Mission Estate undergo considerable expansion, mirroring the overall expansion of the New Zealand wine industry. New buildings and facilities at Mission Estate were opened in 2007, greatly increasing its wine production capacity. In 2012, Mission Estate purchased  of Marlborough vineyards after the 2008 Financial Crisis forced Cape Campbell Wines, the former owner of the land, into receivership. In 2017, Mission Estate took over ownership of founding Bridge Pa Triangle winery Ngatarawa Wines when its owners, Alwyn and Brian Corban (whose family established the Corbans winery), reached retirement age.

Concerts  

Following the death of Michael Jackson in 2009, Mission Estate Winery announced their hosting of The Motown Event; a concert featuring various artists of the Motown music era, to take place on February 13, 2010. Featuring various artists such as Jimmy Barnes, The Temptations, The Four Tops, Joan Osborne and Martha Reeves, the concert sold out and was a critical and financial success.

Following this concert, Mission Estate has garnered a positive reputation as a hosting venue, and has since hosted many other high profile musicians. These include Sting (2011), Sir Rod Stewart (2012/2019/2022), Ben Harper (2016), Dixie Chicks (2017), Avalanche City (2017), Phil Collins (2019), Michael Buble (2020), and Sir Elton John (2020). 

Robbie Williams is scheduled to headline at Mission Estate on November 11, 2023.

References 

Wineries of New Zealand